Busking days are events organised by councils, municipalities, community groups or other organisations to encourage busking in the town, city or other location on a specific day or number of days in a year. Many busking days have become established events, occurring yearly. Some busking days have transformed into street entertainment festivals where the acts are booked and paid an appearance fee or paid an appearance fee and also allowed to 'hat' the audiences. Hatting being the traditional means that acts receive payment for their performances.

In 2010, PRS for Music called on a national busking day in the UK as well as the creation of 'busk stops' to act as a designated area where buskers can play in every town across the country. The campaign is currently being supported by the member of parliament Kevin Brennan, who raised the idea as an early day motion. Busk in London hosted National Busking Day across the UK in 2015. This has grown to International Busking Day in July 2016, with 120 cities around the world taking part. International Busking Day kick starts the Busk in London Festival, Trafalgar Square.

See also 
Busking
List of busking locations

References

External links 
Busk in London Festival (UK)
International Busking Day (worldwide)
Wymondham Music Festival (Norfolk, UK)
Wymondham Busking Day 2005 (UK)
Wymondham Music Festival (UK)
Takoma Park Folk Festival (US)
Toronto Buskerfest (Canada)
Downtown Buskers Festival (Canada)
Tokyo Busker Festival (Japan)
Ferrara Buskers' Festival (Italy)
Coffs Harbour Buskers & Comedy Festival (Australia)
Chicago buskerfest (US)
All Ireland Busking Festival (Ireland)
Singapore Buskers' Festival (Singapore)
Newburyport, MA Buskers' Festival (USA)
Halifax, Nova Scotia, Canada International Buskers Festival (Canada)
Phoenix Busking Festival, Tullamore (Ireland)

Street performance
Busking venues